Galungan is a Balinese holiday celebrating the victory of dharma over adharma. It marks the time when the ancestral spirits visit the Earth. The last day of the celebration is Kuningan, when they return. The date is calculated according to the 210-day Balinese Pawukon calendar.

Significance
Galungan marks the beginning of the most important recurring religious ceremonies. The spirits of deceased relatives who have died and been cremated return to visit their homelands, and the current inhabitants have a responsibility to be hospitable through prayers and offerings. The most obvious sign of the celebrations are the penjor - bamboo poles with offerings suspended at the end. These are installed by the side of roads.  A number of days around the Kuningan day have special names, and are marked by the organization of particular activities.

Dates
Galungan begins on the Wednesday (Buda), the 11th week of the 210-day pawukon calendar. This means that there are often two celebrations per solar year. Dates for 2018-2024 are as follows:

References 
 Balilocalguide.com Calendar of events  Accessed 6 November 2018
 Eiseman, Fred B. Jr, Bali: Sekala and Niskala Volume I: Essays on Religion, Ritual and Art pp 182-185, Periplus Editions, 1989 
 Pancorbo, Lo balinés", en "Fiestas del Mundo. Las Máscaras de la Luna". pp. 33–41. Ediciones del Serbal, Barcelona, 1996.

Notes

External links 
Video documenting Galungan ceremony preparations on Bali part 1, part2
How Galungan is celebrated in Bali 

Religious festivals in Indonesia
Observances set by the Pawukon calendar